Knox Branch is a stream in Wayne County in the U.S. state of Missouri. It is a tributary of the Black River.

The identity of namesake "Knox" is unknown.

See also
List of rivers of Missouri

References

Rivers of Wayne County, Missouri
Rivers of Missouri
Tributaries of the Black River (Arkansas–Missouri)